Oenomaus nigra is a species of butterfly of the family Lycaenidae. It is found in wet lowland forests in Peru and Brazil.

References

Butterflies described in 2008
Eumaeini